Joseph E. Miró (born July 15, 1946) is a Cuban American politician. He was a Republican member of the Delaware House of Representatives from 1998 until his retirement in 2018. He served on the New Castle County Council from 1992 to 1998. He also served as president of the National Hispanic Caucus of State Legislators.

Miró was a teacher in the Christina School District from 1970 to 2001. He is a member of Holy Angels Church in Newark, Delaware.

References

1946 births
Living people
Republican Party members of the Delaware House of Representatives
County council members and commissioners in Delaware
New Castle County, Delaware politicians
American politicians of Cuban descent
21st-century American politicians
Hispanic and Latino American teachers
Lincoln University (Pennsylvania) alumni
University of Delaware alumni
West Chester University alumni
People from Matanzas